A. floribunda may refer to:

 Abarema floribunda, a large tree
 Abelia floribunda, an evergreen shrub
 Acacia floribunda, an Oceanian plant
 Acriopsis floribunda, a flowering plant
 Adenaria floribunda, a New World plant
 Aechmea floribunda, a plant endemic to Brazil
 Akrosida floribunda, a tree native to the Dominican Republic
 Alchornea floribunda, an African plant
 Alchorneopsis floribunda, a New World plant
 Allanblackia floribunda, an African plant
 Alseis floribunda, a New World plant
 Alyxia floribunda, a flowering plant
 Anaxagorea floribunda, a custard apple
 Andradea floribunda, a four o'clock
 Angophora floribunda, a large tree
 Aronia floribunda, a deciduous shrub